Natalia Antonova  (born 25 May 1995) is a Russian track cyclist, representing Russia at international competitions. She won the bronze medal at the 2016–17 UCI Track Cycling World Cup, Round 1 in Glasgow in the team sprint.

Career results
2014
3rd Team Sprint, Memorial of Alexander Lesnikov (with Tatiana Kiseleva)
2015
2nd Team Sprint, Grand Prix Minsk (with Tatiana Kiseleva)
2nd Team Sprint, Memorial of Alexander Lesnikov (with Tatiana Kiseleva)
2016
2nd  Team Sprint, UEC European U23 Championships (with Tatiana Kiseleva)
2017
1st 500m Time Trial, Grand Prix of Moscow
Prilba Moravy
2nd Keirin
2nd Sprint
3rd Keirin, Grand Prix of Tula

References

External links

1995 births
Living people
Russian female cyclists
Russian track cyclists
European Games competitors for Russia
Cyclists at the 2019 European Games